Kate Alice Bishop (1848 – 12 June 1923) was an English actress, a member of a theatrical family. Her brother and daughter were also successful actors. Her greatest success was in Our Boys, which ran for more than four years in London. She temporarily retired from the theatre in the late nineteenth century and returned to play character roles in the early years of the twentieth century.

Biography
Bishop was born in Lambeth into a theatrical family, the daughter of Thomas Bishop and his wife Charlotte, née Woulds. She began acting as a child in her mother's native Bristol in 1863. Her brother Alfred also successfully entered the theatrical profession. Their grandfather, James Woulds, shared with William Macready at one time the management of the historic theatre at Bath.

Career
As a young girl Bishop was a member of Mr J. H. Chute's Bristol company, which included Madge Kendal, Henrietta Hodson and Ellen Terry. In 1868, Bishop appeared with Edward Askew Sothern in a revival of Our American Cousin, in which The Manchester Guardian thought her "arch" but "lacking in dignity". In the West End she appeared in A Loving Cup at the Royalty Theatre in 1869, and in 1871 at the Royal Court Theatre in a succession of three new plays by W. S. Gilbert, playing  Edith Temple in Randall's Thumb, Pipette in Creatures of Impulse, and Jessie Blake in On Guard.  Of her performance in the last, The Times commented, "The notion of the irresistible flirt is completely realized by Miss Kate Bishop." Bishop  played in About Town by Bertie Vyse in 1873 and Ruy Blas Righted and Romulus and Remus, both by Robert Reece, in 1874.

Her most famous stage role was Violet Melrose in H. J. Byron's Our Boys, which she created in January 1875 and played practically continuously throughout its historic run of four years and four months. When Our Boys finally closed, it was by far the longest-running work of theatre up to that time. Byron supplied a successor, The Girls, in which Bishop had another leading role. Family life in Australia took her away from the English stage for some 15 years at the end of the nineteenth century.

In 1900 she returned to the British stage where, in May, she appeared in Another Man's Wife, a new play, in four acts, by Fenton Mackay at the Grand Theatre, Croydon. Later in the year she appeared in Struwwelpeter, at the Garrick Theatre, together with George Grossmith Jr. She played Mrs Percival de Hooley in Jerome K. Jerome's The Passing of the Third Floor Black in 1908. In 1909 she appeared on Broadway in Penelope, by Somerset Maugham, at the Lyceum Theatre. Her last stage appearance was in 1915, as Lady Matilda Rye in H. A. Vachell's The Case of Lady Camber at the Savoy Theatre.

Personal life
In 1885, Bishop married Lewis J. Löhr, treasurer of the Melbourne Opera House. Five years later their daughter Marie Lohr, later a leading actress, was born in Sydney, Australia.

Bishop died in London, aged 75, and is buried in Brompton Cemetery.

References

1848 births
1923 deaths
19th-century English actresses
Actresses from Bristol
Actresses from London
Date of birth unknown
People associated with Gilbert and Sullivan
Women of the Victorian era